John Francis Regis Canevin (June 5, 1853 – March 22, 1927) was an American prelate of the Catholic Church. He served as bishop of the Diocese of Pittsburgh in Pennsylvania from 1904 to 1921.

Biography

Early life 
Regis Canevin was born at Beatty in Westmoreland County, Pennsylvania to Thomas and Rosanna Canevin, on a farm owned by the Sisters of Mercy. After receiving his early education at schools in Beatty, he entered St. Vincent College in 1871 and St. Vincent Seminary in 1875.

Priesthood 
Canevin was ordained to the priesthood by Bishop John Tuigg on June 4, 1879.

Canevin's first assignment was as a curate at St. Mary's Parish in the Lawrenceville neighborhood of Pittsburgh, where he remained until 1881. He then served in the same capacity at St. Paul's Cathedral in Pittsburgh for five years. In 1886, Canevin became chaplain at St. Paul's Orphan Asylum and the Western Penitentiary, as well as pastor of the mission in Canonsburg, Pennsylvania. He served as chancellor of the diocese from 1888 until 1893, when he became pastor of St. Philip's Church in Crafton, Pennsylvania. Canevin was named rector of St. Paul's Cathedral in 1895.

Coadjutor Bishop and Bishop of Pittsburgh 
On January 16, 1903, Canevin was appointed Coadjutor Bishop of Pittsburgh and titular bishop of Sabratha by Pope Leo XIII. He received his episcopal consecration on February 24, 1903, from Archbishop Patrick Ryan, with Bishops John W. Shanahan and Leo Haid serving as co-consecrators. 

Upon the death of Bishop Richard Phelan, Canevin automatically succeeded him to become the fifth bishop of Pittsburgh on December 20, 1904. He was the first American and the first native son of the diocese to become bishop. He penned the article on the "Diocese of Pittsburg" for the Catholic Encyclopedia.

On January 9, 1921, Pope Benedict XV accepted Canevin's resignation as bishop of the Diocese of Pittsburgh and appointed him as titular archbishop of Pelusium. Regis Canevin died at Mercy Hospital in Pittsburgh at age 73, and is buried at St. Mary Cemetery in Lawrenceville.

References

Further reading

External links 
 Roman Catholic Diocese of Pittsburgh History of Bishops webpage
 "Bishops' Row", St. Mary Cemetery, Pittsburgh

1853 births
1927 deaths
Roman Catholic bishops of Pittsburgh
Religious leaders from Pittsburgh
20th-century Roman Catholic bishops in the United States
Contributors to the Catholic Encyclopedia
American Roman Catholic clergy of Irish descent
Catholics from Pennsylvania